Sir Richard Sheridan Patrick Michael Aloysius Franklin Bowling  (born 26 February 1934, Bartica, British Guiana), known as Frank Bowling, is a Guyana-born British artist. His paintings relate to Abstract expressionism, Color Field painting, and Lyrical Abstraction. He has been described as "one of Britain’s greatest living abstract painters", as "one of the most distinguished black artists to emerge from post-war British art schools" and as a "modern master". He is the first Black artist to be elected a member of the Royal Academy of Arts.

Biography

Early years
Bowling was born in Bartica, Guyana, to Richard Bowling, a police district paymaster, and his wife Agatha, a seamstress, dressmaker and milliner. In 1953, at age 19, Bowling emigrated to Britain, where he lived with an uncle and completed his education.

After doing his National Service in the Royal Air Force, Bowling went on to study art, despite earlier ambitions to be a poet and a writer. He studied at the Chelsea School of Art, then in 1959 won a scholarship to London's Royal College of Art, where fellow students included artists such as David Hockney, Derek Boshier, Allen Jones, R. B. Kitaj and Peter Phillips. At graduation in 1962, Hockney was awarded the gold medal while Bowling was given the silver. Bowling had been tipped to win the gold but due to his controversial 1960 marriage to Royal College Registrar Paddy Kitchen (controversial because Kitchen was a staff member; relationships were banned between staff and students), he was relegated to silver. His first one-person exhibition, entitled Image in Revolt, was held in London in 1962 at the Grabowski Gallery, and other exhibitions followed. However, Bowling was frustrated at being pigeonholed as a Caribbean artist; as he said in a 2012 Guardian interview with Laura Barnett: "It seemed that everyone was expecting me to paint some kind of protest art out of postcolonial discussion. For a while I fell for it. I painted a picture called the Martyrdom of Patrice Lumumba."

1960s–present
A move to New York in the mid-1960s exposed Bowling to his American contemporaries and soon won him a place in the 1971 Whitney Biennial. As Maya Jaggi writes: "unlike contemporaries who founded British pop art, Bowling took a singular path, from Bacon-esque figurative painting to an abstract art touched by personal memory and history.... Encouraged by the US critic Clement Greenberg, he found a freedom in abstract art, alongside Mark Rothko, Jackson Pollock and Barnett Newman." Between 1969 and 1972 Bowling was a contributing editor of Arts Magazine.

Bowling now spends part of each year between London and New York, where he maintains studios.

Exhibitions and collections
Bowling's paintings have been shown in numerous exhibitions in Europe, the United Kingdom and the United States and are included in major private and corporate collections worldwide. His work can also be seen in the permanent collections of the Metropolitan Museum of Art and the Museum of Modern Art in New York, as well as the Tate Gallery in London.

In 2017, there was a retrospective of his work at Haus der Kunst in Munich. A major retrospective exhibition of his work was on view at Tate Britain in 2019. Land of Many Waters, a major exhibition of unseen works by Bowling, alongside key paintings from the previous decade, was exhibited at the Arnolfini in Bristol in 2021. In 2022, the Stephen Lawrence Gallery at the University of Greenwich focused on his sculptures and the sculptural aspects of his paintings in an exhibition called Frank Bowling and sculpture. his exhibition Frank Bowling's Americas is at the Museum of Fine Arts Boston from 22 October 2022 to 9 April 2023 and will be at the San Francisco Museum of Modern Art (SFMOMA) from 13 May to 10 September 2023.

Critical assessment
Bowling has been described as "one of Britain’s greatest living abstract painters", as "one of the most distinguished black artists to emerge from post-war British art schools" and as a "modern master". Writing for Art Basel, the art curator Sam Cornish said: "Central to Bowling’s art is an astonishing aliveness to the mutability of color, as hue and material, combined with a flair for accumulating granular visual detail into dramatic, large-scale panoramas".

Awards and honours
Bowling has received two Guggenheim Fellowships.

In 1965 at the First World Festival of Negro Arts, held in Dakar, Senegal, Bowling's painting "Big Bird" won the Grand Prize for Contemporary Arts.

On 26 May 2005 Bowling was elected a member of the Royal Academy of Arts. He was among about a dozen artists proposed to fill one of two vacancies in the 80-member academy, and is the first Black artist to be elected a Royal Academician in the history of the institution. He was elected a Senior Royal Academician on 1 October 2011.

In 2008 he was appointed Officer of the Order of the British Empire (OBE) in the Queen's Birthday Honours. He was knighted in the 2020 Birthday Honours for services to art.

Family life
Bowling is married to textile artist Rachel Scott.

While working at the Royal College of Art he met the novelist, biographer and art critic Paddy Kitchen when she was a member of staff there. They married in 1960 (divorcing later in the 1960s) and had one son, who is now deceased:  Richard Sheridan Bowling (1962–2001), known as Dan Bowling.

Frank Bowling has two other sons: Ben Bowling (born 1962), Professor of Criminology & Criminal Justice at King's College London, whose mother is the artist Claire Spencer; and Sacha Bowling, a film maker and photographer, whose mother is Irene Delderfield Bowling.

References

External links
  
 
 Frank Bowling  at the Institute of International Visual Arts
 Miles, A J "Frank Bowling Contemporary Abstract Artist" 
 
 "Artist Frank Bowling on how he paints", The Observer, 20 September 2009
  "Frank Bowling – works from the studio. Curator: Spencer Richards". Skoto Gallery
 
 Frank Bowling artist page Hauser & Wirth
 How to Paint Like Frank Bowling, Tate, 2019. Retrieved 26 January 2023.

1934 births
Living people
20th-century British male artists
20th-century British painters
20th-century Guyanese painters
20th-century male artists
20th-century Royal Air Force personnel
21st-century British male artists
21st-century British painters
21st-century Guyanese painters
21st-century male artists
Academics of Camberwell College of Arts
Alumni of the Royal College of Art
Black British artists
British male painters
Guyanese emigrants to England
Knights Bachelor
Officers of the Order of the British Empire
People from Cuyuni-Mazaruni
Royal Academicians